Kenneth Walton 'Kenny' Jenkins (born May 8, 1959) is a former American football running back.

He played in the National Football League for the Philadelphia Eagles, Detroit Lions, and Washington Redskins from 1982 to 1987.  He played college football at Bucknell University.  Jenkins retired from the Washington Redskins in 1987. He holds an NFL record as the only player to amass 75+ yards rushing, 75+ yards receiving, and 75+ yards on kickoff returns in one game.

Business
Jenkins, a senior advisor, is a top producer for National Financial Partners, an insurance and financial-solutions company. He is also a motivational speaker. 

Jenkins is a member of the board of trustees for Landon School, a private independent school in Bethesda, Maryland; a member of the Washington, DC Board of Trade; and board member for several nonprofits.

Jenkins has previously served as  president of the NFL Players Association Former Players Chapter in Washington, DC.

References

External links
 'NFL-Jenkins Career Statistics'

1959 births
Living people
American football running backs
Bucknell Bison football players
Detroit Lions players
Players of American football from Washington, D.C.
Washington Redskins players